Swapnabhumi (The Promised Land) is a 2007 Bangladeshi documentary film by Tanvir Mokammel. The film tells the plight of Stranded Pakistanis in Bangladesh, who are also identified as Biharis.

Plot
The film highlights the current stateless status of Stranded Pakistanis in Bangladesh, otherwise known as Biharis. The story of six decades, three countries- India, Pakistan, Bangladesh and statelessness of about more than 150,000 people from the Urdu-speaking community people who originally emigrated from India to Bangladesh. It highlights the violence against Biharis and their despair of not being able to settle in Pakistan, which the Biharis see as a betrayal.

Music
Background score by Syed Shabab Ali Arzoo with sound by Nahid Masud, the film used tracks used before in popular culture.

Reception
The film premiered at the International Documentary Film Festival Amsterdam in 2007. It was screened at the Bahrain International Film Festival in 2009, where it received critical praise. In 2009, the film won second best documentary film award at the Film South Asia Film Festival at Kathmandu.

References

Sources

External links
The Promised Land on Tanvir Mokammel site

2007 films
2007 documentary films
Bengali-language Bangladeshi films
2000s Bengali-language films
Bangladeshi documentary films
Films directed by Tanvir Mokammel
Documentary films about human rights